The Plymouth is a historic building in Washington, D.C., United States. It is in the Logan Circle-Shaw neighborhood in the Northwest Quadrant of the city.  Frederick Atkinson designed the building in the Classical Revival style and it was completed in 1903.  It was listed on the National Register of Historic Places in 1986.

References

Residential buildings completed in 1903
Apartment buildings in Washington, D.C.
Neoclassical architecture in Washington, D.C.
Residential buildings on the National Register of Historic Places in Washington, D.C.
Logan Circle (Washington, D.C.)